Phidippus cardinalis is a species of jumping spider. It is commonly called cardinal jumper. It is one of the species of jumping spiders which are mimics of mutillid wasps in the genus Dasymutilla (commonly known as "velvet ants"); several species of these wasps are similar in size and coloration to the spiders, and possess a very painful sting.

Distribution
Phidippus cardinalis occurs in the eastern United States and Mexico, and possibly Panama.

External links
Photographs of P. cardinalis
Diagnostic drawings
Taxonomic references
Roach, S. H. 1988. Reproductive periods of Phidippus species (Araneae, Salticidae) in South Carolina. J. Arachnol., 16:95-101 (pdf)

Salticidae
Spiders of North America
Spiders described in 1845
Taxa named by Nicholas Marcellus Hentz